The 1980 Ipswich Borough Council election was the second election to the Ipswich Borough Council under the  system of electing by thirds, whereby a third of the councillors were to stand for election, each time. These new arrangements had been determined by the Local Government Boundary Commission as laid out in their Report 280.

It took place as part of the 1982 United Kingdom local elections.  

There were 16 wards each returning one councillor. The Labour Party retained control of the Council.

References

Ipswich Borough Council elections
Ipswich